The Butte Falls Ranger Station, located in Rogue River – Siskiyou National Forest in Butte Falls, Oregon, was built in 1935 by the Civilian Conservation Corps.  It was designed by architects of the United States Forest Service in rustic style.

It was listed on the National Register of Historic Places in 1986 for its architecture.

It includes the 1938-built station building, a -story building on a concrete foundation with a wood-shingle roof.  It includes a pine tree shaped cutout in the east and south gable ends of the roof, and a knotty pine interior.

The Ranger's Residence building was built in 1936.

Butte Falls Ranger Station, Ranger's Residence Garage also includes pine tree cutouts under the roof apex at east and west gable ends.

The Butte Falls Ranger Station, Residence #1001 was built in 1935.

See also 
 Big Butte Creek Falls

References

Rustic architecture in Oregon
Civilian Conservation Corps in Oregon
Government buildings completed in 1935
Buildings and structures in Jackson County, Oregon
Park buildings and structures on the National Register of Historic Places in Oregon
United States Forest Service ranger stations
1935 establishments in Oregon
National Register of Historic Places in Jackson County, Oregon